Mayor Square - NCI is a stop on the Luas light-rail tram system in Dublin, Ireland.  It opened in 2009 as one of four stops on an extension of the Red Line through the docklands to The Point.  The stop is located in the middle of a tram lane on Mayor Street Lower, adjacent to Mayor Square, and provides access to the National College of Ireland main campus and other parts of the International Financial Services Centre.

Mayor Square - NCI is served by Dublin Bus routes 33D, 33X, 53A, 90, 142, 151, and 757.

References

Luas Red Line stops in Dublin (city)